The 2012 United States House of Representatives elections in Nebraska were held on Tuesday, November 6, 2012 and elected the three U.S. Representatives from the state of Nebraska. The elections coincided with the elections of other federal and state offices, including a quadrennial presidential election and an election to the U.S. Senate. Primary elections were held on May 15, 2012.

Redistricting
A redistricting plan was passed by the Nebraska Legislature on May 24, 2011, after a five-hour Democratic-led filibuster was defeated. The plan signed into law by Republican Governor Dave Heineman.

District 1
Republican Jeff Fortenberry, who has represented Nebraska's 1st congressional district since 2005, did not run for the U.S. Senate, and is running for re-election.

Republican primary

Candidates

Nominee
Jeff Fortenberry, incumbent U.S. Representative

Eliminated in primary
Dennis Parker, former professional musician and candidate for the 3rd district in 2010,
Jessica Turek, writer and drummer

Primary results

Democratic primary

Candidates

Nominee
Korey Reiman, attorney

Withdrawn
Robert Way, Army combat medic

Primary results

General election

Polling

Results

District 2
Republican Lee Terry, who has represented Nebraska's 2nd congressional district since 1999, did not run for the U.S. Senate, and ran for re-election.

David Wasserman of The Cook Political Report rates the race as "Likely Republican."

Republican primary

Candidates

Nominee
Lee Terry, incumbent U.S. Representative

Eliminated in primary
Paul Anderson, employee of BNSF Railway
Glenn Freeman, former chairman of the Douglas County Republican Party
Jack Heidel, the chairman of the mathematics department at the University of Nebraska at Omaha;
Brett Lindstrom, a financial adviser and former Nebraska Cornhuskers quarterback

Primary results

Democratic primary

Candidates

Nominee
John Ewing, Douglas County Treasurer

Eliminated in primary
Gwen Howard, state senator

Declined
Howard Warren Buffett, director of the U.S. Department of Defense's agriculture development program in Iraq and Afghanistan and the grandson of investor and philanthropist Warren Buffett

Primary results

General election

Campaign
After his primary victory, Ewing promptly took a break from fundraising before starting up again at the end of June.By the end of the fundraising quarter had only raised $300,000 to Terry's $1.3 million. The Omaha World-Herald would later describe this is "perhaps the race's defining moment" and one that prevented Ewing from gaining much traction in the general election.

Terry's campaign also made mistakes, most notably releasing an ad that inaccurately quoted a nonprofit advocacy group.

Endorsements

Polling

Predictions

Results
Despite receiving very little help from national Democrats, Ewing outperformed Obama and lost to Terry by just 4,197 votes.

District 3
Republican Adrian Smith, who has represented Nebraska's 3rd congressional district since 2007, is running for re-election.

Republican primary

Candidates

Nominee
Adrian Smith, incumbent U.S. Representative

Eliminated in primary
Bob Lingenfelter, farmer and former NFL offensive lineman

Primary results

Democratic primary

Candidates

Nominee
Mark Sullivan, farmer

Primary results

General election

Polling

Results

References

External links
Elections from the Nebraska Secretary of State
United States House of Representatives elections in Nebraska, 2012 at Ballotpedia
Nebraska U.S. House at OurCampaigns.com
Campaign contributions for U.S. Congressional races in Nebraska at OpenSecrets
Outside spending at the Sunlight Foundation
 Map of Nebraska's new congressional districts, published by the Nebraska Legislature

Nebraska
2012
2012 Nebraska elections